Nativex (formerly W3i) is a mobile advertising platform company headquartered in San Francisco, California and St. Cloud, Minnesota. Nativex provides top brands, games and apps advertising technology to engage with their mobile audience. Nativex is an authorized ad service provider for Tencent, Bytedance, UC & Baidu. Through these partnerships, Nativex provides western advertisers and publishers the ability to market their mobile app and grow their mobile user base.

The company was listed in American City Business Journals' Fast 50 as one of the fastest-growing companies in Minneapolis–Saint Paul for 2013.

History

In 2000, twin brothers Rob and Ryan Weber founded Nativex as a desktop-based advertising company.

On March 1, 2016, Nativex announced that it has been acquired by Mobvista, the largest mobile ad network company in Asia, for $24.5 million. On June 1, 2019, Nativex, announced the opening of a new office in Sao, Paulo, Brazil as it looks to build on the growth of its mobile advertising business in Latin America. On March 11, 2020, Mobvista reorganized its business to incorporate all client-facing business under Nativex.

References

External links
 Nativex website

Companies based in Minnesota
Technology companies of the United States
Technology companies based in the San Francisco Bay Area